An aquiherbosa is a plant community of herbaceous plants that exists in abundantly wet areas. This can refer to plant communities in wetlands, ponds, or other bodies of water.

References

Habitat

"aquiherbosa  The herbaceous communities of ponds and swamps; subdivided into emersiherbosa, sphagniherbosa and submersiherbosa q.v."